Punctoterebra polygyrata is a species of sea snail, a marine gastropod mollusk in the family Terebridae, the auger snails.

Description
The length of the shell varies between 16 mm and 33 mm.

Distribution
This marine species occurs off Papua New Guinea, off Mozambique and off Iran.

References

External links
 Deshayes, G. P. (1859). A general review of the genus Terebra, and a description of new species. Proceedings of the Zoological Society of London. (1859) 27: 270-321
 Melvill J.C. (1912). Descriptions of thirty-three new species of Gastropoda from the Persian Gulf, Gulf of Oman, and North Arabian Sea. Proceedings of the Malacological Society of London. 10(3): 240-254, pls 11-12
 Fedosov, A. E.; Malcolm, G.; Terryn, Y.; Gorson, J.; Modica, M. V.; Holford, M.; Puillandre, N. (2020). Phylogenetic classification of the family Terebridae (Neogastropoda: Conoidea). Journal of Molluscan Studies

Terebridae
Gastropods described in 1859